Libby Gleeson AM (born 1950) is an Australian children's author. Born in Young, New South Wales, she is one of six children, the sister of former ABC TV Washington Correspondent Michael Gleeson, and the mother of Home and Away actress Jessica Tovey and Sydney Morning Herald journalist Josephine Tovey.  Her sister, Margie Gleeson, works as the head teacher of Creative and Performing Arts at Albury High School.

She studied at the University of Sydney where she took history before teaching for two years in the rural town of Picton near Sydney. In the mid-1970s she lived for five years in Italy where she taught English and then London, where she began to write her first novel, Eleanor Elizabeth. Once returned from overseas she taught at the University of Sydney.

In the last twenty years, she has written twenty books and taught occasional courses in creative writing. She specialises in picture books, novels for young children and also novels for slightly older readers. She's also written scripts for the ABC's Bananas in Pyjamas and Magic Mountain. She is married to scientist Euan Tovey, has three adult daughters and lives in Sydney's inner west. She is currently a Fellow on the World Research, Advisory and Education Team of MindChamps with a focus on education.

Picture books

One Sunday Illustrated by John Winch
Mum Goes to Work Illustrated by Penny Azar
Where's Mum? Illustrated by Craig Smith
Sleep Time Illustrated by Armin Greder
Big Dog (1991) Illustrated by Armin Greder
The Princess and the Perfect Dish (1995) Illustrated by Armin Greder
The Great Bear (1999) Illustrated by Armin Greder
An Ordinary Day (2001) Illustrated by Armin Greder
Shutting the Chooks In (2003) Illustrated by Ann James
Cuddle Time (2004) Illustrated by Julie Vivas
Amy and Louis (2006) Illustrated by Freya Blackwood
Clancy and Millie and the Very Fine House (2009) Illustrated by Freya Blackwood
A Simply Spectacular Hat (2009) Illustrated by Dee Texidor

Junior fiction

Skating on Sand (1994) Illustrated by Ann James
Hannah Plus One (1996) Illustrated by Ann James
Queen of the Universe (1997) Illustrated by David Cox
Hannah and the Tomorrow Room (1999) Illustrated by Ann James
Dear Writer (2000) Illustrated by David Cox
My Story: The Rum Rebellion, the diary of David Bellamy (2001)
Hannah the Famous(2004) Illustrated by Ann James
Ray's Olympics (2006) Illustrated by David Cox
Happy Birthday X3 (2007) Illustrated by David Cox
Clancy's Long Walk (2007) Illustrated by Chantal Stewart
Red (2012)

Young adult fiction

Eleanor, Elizabeth (1984)
I am Susannah (1987)
Dodger (1990)
Love Me, Love Me Not (1993)
Refuge (1998)
Mahtab's Story (2008)

Awards
1991 Children's Peace Literature Award
1997 Lady Cutler Award
1997 CBCA Book of the Year, Younger Readers
2007 Member of the Order of Australia
2011 Dromkeen Medal
2011 NSW Premier's Literary Awards - Special Award
2013 Prime Minister's Literary Awards - children's fiction
2015 Children's Book of the Year Award: Younger Readers

Notes

External links
 Libby Gleeson website

1950 births
Living people
Australian children's writers
Australian screenwriters
Writers from Sydney
Members of the Order of Australia
People from Young, New South Wales
Australian women children's writers